Taraba is a state in North Eastern Nigeria, named after the Taraba River, which traverses the southern part of the state. Taraba state's capital is Jalingo. The main ethnic groups are the Fulani, Mumuye, Mambilla, Wurkuns, Jukun, Kuteb, Yandang, Ndola, Itchen, Tigun and Jibu. The northern parts is mainly dominated by Fulani of Muri emirate. The southern parts are dominated by the Jukun Jukun, Chamba, Tiv, Kuteb and Ichen.The central region is mainly occupied by the Fulani, Mambilla and the Jibu peoples. There are over 77 different tribes, and their languages in Taraba State.

History
Taraba state was created out of the former Gongola state on 27 August 1991, by the military government of General Ibrahim Babangida.

Geography

Taraba state is bounded in the west by Nasarawa state and Benue state, northwest by Plateau state, north by Bauchi state and Gombe state, northeast by Adamawa state, and south by Northwest Region in Cameroon.

The Benue, Donga, Taraba and Ibi are the main rivers in the state. They rise from the Cameroonian mountains, straining almost the entire length of the state in the North and South directions to link up with the River Niger.

Climate 
The climate of Taraba state is marked by an annual average temperature of 33°C but high level of cold in January and an increased rainfall in August. The percentage of rainfall in Taraba state is 40.35% with 54.98% relative humidity. The state is usually very warm in March with 40.44°C, and an average wind of 8.84km/h.

Healthcares 
Taraba state has many hospitals and health care centers, some of them are:

 Courage hospital
 Federal Medical Center (FMC)
 Gateway hospital
 General hospital bali
 Sauki hospital and maternity
 Totus hospital and maternity
 Albert healthcare company
 Taraba specialist hospital
 kwararafa hospital and maternity
 Federal polythecnic bali medical center
 First referral hospital
 Biyama hospital

Local government areas

Taraba state consists of sixteen (16) Local Government Areas (or LGAs), which are governed by elected chairmen. The local government areas are listed as follows:

 Ardo Kola
 Bali
 Donga
 Gashaka
 Gassol
 Ibi
 Jalingo
 Karim Lamido
 Kurmi
 Lau
 Sardauna
 Takum
 Ussa
 Wukari
 Yorro
 Zing

Languages
Languages of Taraba state listed by LGA include:

Ussa. Kuteb language

Other languages spoken in Taraba state are Akum, Bukwen, Esimbi, Fali of Baissa, Jiba, Njerep, Tha, Yandang, Yotti, Ywom.

Education 
Taraba State has many schools and education centers.

Universities 

 Federal University, Wukari
 Taraba State University Jalingo
 Kwararafa University Wukari

Agriculture
The major occupation of the people of Taraba state is agriculture. Cash crops produced in the state include coffee, tea, groundnuts and cotton. Crops such as maize, rice, sorghum, millet, cassava, and yam are also produced in commercial quantity. In addition, cattle, sheep and goats are reared in large numbers, especially on the Mambilla Plateau, and along the Benue and Taraba valleys. Similarly, the people of Taraba state undertake other livestock production activities like poultry production, rabbit breeding and pig farming in fairly large scale. Communities living on the banks of River Benue, River Taraba, River Donga and Ibi, engage in fishing all year round. Other occupational activities such as pottery, cloth-weaving, dyeing, mat-making, carving, embroidery and blacksmithing are also carried out in various parts of the state.

Natural resources 
Taraba state has abundant natural resources for industrial and commercial use, these include:

Mineral raw materials 

 Barytes
 Bauxites
 Graphite
 Limestone
 Gypsum
 Kaoline
 Feldspar
 Mica
 Pyrite
 Uranium
 Gemstone

Agro-raw materials 

 Maize
 millet
 Sorghum
 Rice
 Groundnut
 Cassava
 Fish
 Gum Arabic
 Cotton
 Timber
 Palm oil
 Cocoa
 Citrus
 Sugarcane
 Soya Beans

Culture
The government has made concerted efforts to improve areas of tourist attractions like Mambilla Tourist Center, Gumpti Park and game reserve in Gashaka;, Karimjo Abedahh festival and the Nwunyu fishing festival in Ibi, all this is usually held in April of each year where activities such as canoe racing, swimming competition and cultural dances are held. Other festivals are Purma of the Chamba in Donga, Takum and Jibu culture dance in Bali, the Tagba of Acha People in Takum, Kuchecheb of Kutebs in Takum and Ussa, Kati of the Mambilla and host of others. Taraba is called "Nature's gift to the nation" as the state is rich and has many ethnic groups, including Kuteb, Chamba, Yandang, Mumuyes, Mambila, Karimjo, Wurkums, Jenjo, Jukun, Ichen, Tiv, Kaka, Pena, Kambu, kodei, Wawa, Vute, Fulani, Hausa and Ndola.

A striking historical fact about the State is that it encompasses part of the Mambilla Region which is famed as the Bantu cradle, having been occupied for some five millennia to date (Schwartz, 1972; Zeitlyn & Connell, 2003).

Gallery

Notable people

Late Aisha Alhassan - Former Nigerian Minister of Women Affairs, Former Senator of Northern Zone of Taraba
Emmanuel Bwacha - Senator Representing Southern Taraba, Deputy Senate Minority Leader at National Assembly
Theophilus Danjuma - Nigerian soldier, Politician, Businessman, Nigerian Chief of Army Staff (1975-1979), Minister of Defence (1999-2003)
  Anna Darius Ishaku - Barrister, First Lady of the state/Wife to the Executive Governor, Darius Ishaku
Darius Dickson Ishaku - Current Governor of Taraba state
 Agbu Kefas - Governorship PDP Flag Bearer, 2023 Election
 Shuaibu Isa Lau - Senator representing Taraba North
Saleh Mamman, Nigerian minister of power
Mahmud Mohammed - Nigerian Jurist and former Chief Justice of Nigeria
Jolly Nyame - Former Governor of Taraba state
Danbaba Suntai - Nigerian pharmacist, Politician, Former Governor of Taraba state
 Abbas Njidda Tafida - Current Emir of Muri
Yusuf Abubakar Yusuf - Senator Representing Central Taraba, Member of the All Progressive Congress(APC),Caretaker/Extraordinary Convention Planning Committee (CECPC)

politics
The state government is led by a democratically elected governor who works closely with members of the state's house of assembly. The capital city of the state is Jalingo.

Electoral System
The governor of the state is selected using a modified two-round system. To be elected in the first round, a candidate must receive the plurality of votes and over 25% of votes in at least two-third of the state local government areas. If no candidate passes threshold, a second round will be held between the top candidate and the next candidate to have received a plurality of votes in the highest number of local government areas.

References

External links

Nigerian Post Office- with map of LGAs of the state

 
States of Nigeria
States and territories established in 1991
1991 establishments in Nigeria